(Just resist sin), BWV 54, is a church cantata by Johann Sebastian Bach. He composed the solo cantata for alto in Weimar between 1711 and 1714, and probably performed it on the seventh Sunday after Trinity, 15 July 1714. It is Bach's first extant church cantata for a solo voice.

The text of the short work was written by Georg Christian Lehms, for two arias and a connecting recitative. The topic is to resist sin, based on the Epistle of James. The text was published in a 1711 collection, dedicated to the Sunday Oculi. It is not known when Bach composed the work but is assumed that he performed it as part of his monthly cantata productions in 1714 on the seventh Sunday after Trinity, 15 July. The solo voice is accompanied by strings: two violin parts, two viola parts and continuo. The composition begins with a striking dissonant chord.

History and words 

The history of the composition is not clear. It concentrates on avoiding sin, based on the Epistle of James. The first line of movement 3 quotes . Bach may have composed the cantata already before taking up regular cantata compositions in Weimar. He was appointed concertmaster of the Weimar court capelle of the co-reigning dukes Wilhelm Ernst and Ernst August of Saxe-Weimar, on 2 March 1714.

The Bach scholar Alfred Dürr suggested that Bach performed the cantata for the Seventh Sunday after Trinity of 1714. The prescribed readings for the Sunday are from the Epistle to the Romans, "the wages of sin is death; but the gift of God is eternal life", and from the Gospel of Mark, the feeding of the 4000.  The cantata text relates to the epistle of both Sundays, but shows no connection to either Gospel.

While Dürr assumes that Bach first performed the cantata on 15 July 1714, other scholars arrive at different dates. John Eliot Gardiner and others assume Oculi that year which would make it the earliest cantata performed after the promotion.

If the cantata was written early in Bach's (second) Weimar period, then perhaps the soloist could have been Adam Immanuel Weldig, the only falsettist in the Weimar court chapel in 1708 (the other five singers being a bass, two tenors and two teenage discantists). However, Weldig's designation as "falsettist" may indicate that he was a soprano and not an alto. Weldig left Weimar in 1713 so could not have sung if the first performance was as late as 1714 as suggested by Dürr.

Scoring and structure 

The cantata, structured in three movements, is scored as chamber music for a solo alto voice, two violins (Vl), two violas (Va), and basso continuo (Bc). The duration is given as 14 minutes. The manuscript title page reads: "Cantata.à 2 Violini, 2 Viole, Alto, Solo,
è Cont.: del J.S.B.".

In the following table of the movements, the scoring follows the Neue Bach-Ausgabe. The keys and time signatures are taken from Alfred Dürr, using the symbols for common time (4/4) and alla breve (2/2). The continuo, playing throughout, is not shown.

Music

1 
The first movement, "" (Just resist sin) is a da capo aria, which opens with a surprising dissonance and leaves its key of E-flat major open until a cadence in measure 8. Dürr describes it as a call to resistance and compares it to the beginning of the recitative "", a call to be ready, in the cantata for Advent Nun komm, der Heiden Heiland, BWV 61, composed in 1714. Gardiner comments: "It is a deliberate shock tactic to rouse his
listeners to the need to 'stand firm against all sinning, or its poison will possess you'". Bach used the first aria again in his St Mark Passion.

2 
The recitative "" (The way of vile sins) is secco, accompanied by the continuo. The words "So zeigt sich nur ein leerer Schatten und übertünchtes Grab" (It shows itself as only an empty shadow and a whitewashed grave) are expressed in "pale" harmonies.

3 
The final aria "" (He who sins is of the devil) is again a da capo aria, but shows elements of a four-part fugue for the voice, the violins in unison, the violas in unison and the continuo. Gardiner describes the theme as "insinuating chromatic" and the "contorted counter-subject to portray the wily shackles of the devil".

Recordings 

The sortable listing is taken from the selection provided by Aryeh Oron on the Bach-Cantatas website. The sortable table is based on the listing on the Bach Cantatas website. The type of orchestra is roughly shown as a large group by red background, and as an ensemble playing period instruments in historically informed performance by green background.

Notes

References

Sources 
 {{IMSLP|work=Widerstehe doch der Sünde, BWV 54 (Bach, Johann Sebastian)|cname=Widerstehe doch der Sünde, BWV 54}}
 Widerstehe doch der Sünde, BWV 54; BC A 51 / Sacred cantata (7th Sunday after Trinity) Leipzig University
 Widerstehe doch der Sünde history, scoring, Bach'' website 
 BWV 54 Widerstehe doch der Sünde, English translation, University of Vermont

External links 
 Widerstehe doch der Sünde, BWV 54: performance by the Netherlands Bach Society (video and background information)
 Johann Sebastian Bach (1685–1750): Widerstehe doch der Sünde, BWV 54 saturdaychorale.com 30 April 2015
Víkingur Ólafsson – Bach: Widerstehe doch der Sünde, BWV 54 (Transcr. by Víkingur Ólafsson)  live at Harpa, Reykjavík. https://www.youtube.com/watch?v=nGXBudB_reM&list=RDnGXBudB_reM&start_radio=1 Deutsche Grammophon: Víkingur Ólafsson

Church cantatas by Johann Sebastian Bach
1714 compositions